Prem Singh Rana is an Indian politician and member of the Bharatiya Janata Party. Rana is a former member of the Uttarakhand Legislative Assembly from the Nanakmatta constituency in Udham Singh Nagar district.

References 

People from Udham Singh Nagar district
Bharatiya Janata Party politicians from Uttarakhand
Members of the Uttarakhand Legislative Assembly
Living people
Uttarakhand MLAs 2017–2022
1976 births